The Ambassador of Zimbabwe to the United States is the official representative of the Zimbabwean government at the Embassy of Zimbabwe in Washington, D.C.

History of the office 
On April 18, 1980, the governments in Harare and Washington, D.C. established diplomatic relations. The President of Zimbabwe at the time was Canaan Banana, and the President of the United States was Jimmy Carter.

List of ambassadors

See also 

United States–Zimbabwe relations
List of ambassadors of the United States to Zimbabwe

References

 
United States
Zimbabwe